Rear Admiral James Meredith Helm (December 16, 1855 – October 28, 1927) was an American military officer in the United States Navy during the Spanish–American War.

Early life and education
Born at Grayville, Illinois, Helm graduated from the United States Naval Academy in 1875.

Career 
He served in various ships and abroad until the Spanish–American War, when he commanded the gunboat . In the blockade of Cuba, he captured a Spanish steamer and three contraband schooners, and was advanced five numbers in grade for outstanding performance at the Battle of Manzanillo on 30 June 1898.

During World War I, Helm was Commandant of the 4th Naval District and received the Navy Cross for his achievements.

The destroyer  was named for him.

Personal life 
He retired December 16, 1919 and died October 28, 1927.

References
 

1855 births
1927 deaths
Recipients of the Navy Cross (United States)
United States Navy admirals
United States Naval Academy alumni
Burials at Arlington National Cemetery
American military personnel of the Spanish–American War
United States Navy personnel of World War I
People from Grayville, Illinois
Military personnel from Illinois